Pegasus Coffee Company (also known as Pegasus Coffee House) is a coffee company operating in Bainbridge Island and Seattle, in the U.S. state of Washington. The business has operated Pegasus Coffee Bar on 3rd Avenue, in the lobby of the Dexter Horton Building, in downtown Seattle.

History 
Jeff Waite was an owner. Matt Grady purchased the company in 2019. The company acquired Dudes Donuts in 2022.

Reception 
Financial Times included the Bainbridge Island location in a 2022 list of readers' picks for the best independent coffee shops in the world.

References

External links 

 

Bainbridge Island, Washington
Coffee companies of the United States
Companies based in Washington (state)
Downtown Seattle
Restaurants in Seattle